Rolling Loud is an international hip hop music festival held in the United States, Europe, Australia and Canada. Established in 2015, it is "one of the biggest rap-only festivals in the world" according to Complex, while Billboard called it "the be-all of hip-hop festivals". In 2019, an estimated 210,000 people attended the event in Miami.

History
The festival was founded in 2015 by Matt Zingler and Tariq Cherif, who met in elementary school in Hollywood, Florida. Once in high school, the pair began organizing and promoting parties which "leaned heavily on a mix of Southern and Midwestern rap". They moved on to professional live music events in 2010, beginning with an after-party headlined by Rick Ross. By the summer of 2013, they were hosting monthly events in Miami featuring up-and-coming artists like Travis Scott and Kendrick Lamar. The pair also promoted artists from Florida's burgeoning SoundCloud rap scene under the brand name Dope Entertainment before noticing the need for a genre-specific music festival.

The first Rolling Loud took place in Miami, Florida in February 2015 and featured artists such as Schoolboy Q, Juicy J, Currensy, and Action Bronson in the one-day event. It took place at Soho Studios in the Wynwood district of the city, though the venue was temporarily flooded during the event due to rain.

In 2016, Rolling Loud was held at the larger Mana Wynwood convention center and featured Ty Dolla $ign, Young Thug, and Future as the headlining acts.

In 2017, Rolling Loud moved to Bayfront Park in Downtown Miami. Since 2018, it has been hosted at Hard Rock Stadium in Miami Gardens. 2017 was also the year the festival expanded to other cities with the inaugural editions of Rolling Loud Bay Area and Rolling Loud Southern California.

In 2019 Rolling Loud added Rolling Loud Australia in Sydney, Australia and Rolling Loud NYC to their list of host cities. In the same year, they announced Rolling Loud’s first European festival would take place in Portugal and would be held in July, 2020.

However, the 2020 festival originally scheduled to take place from May 8 to May 10 in the US was rescheduled for July 23 to July 25, 2021, in response to the ongoing COVID-19 pandemic in the United States. The European edition in Portugal also had to be rescheduled for 2021 due to similar circumstances.

In 2021, Rolling Loud hosted a post-pandemic festival in Miami, with more than 200,000 attendees. The festival included a collaboration with WWE, and featured a Friday Night Smackdown.

In 2022, Rolling Loud continued to expand to other countries. Rolling Loud's first partnership with a European festival was announced in 2021 as a collaboration with the 2022 edition of WOO HAH! held in Hilvarenbeek, Netherlands from July 1–3, 2022. A second edition of Rolling Loud in The Netherlands will be held in Rotterdam from June 30–July 1, 2023.

After being postponed in 2020 and 2021 due to the COVID-19 pandemic,  Rolling Loud Portugal took place on July 6–8, 2022. In Canada, Rolling Loud Toronto took place on September 9–11, 2022. The festival's California edition took place at Inglewood's SoFi Stadium for the first time on March 3–5, 2023. On October 25, 2022, the festival announced its first edition in Thailand, which is scheduled to take place from April 13–15, 2023. Rolling Loud will also make its debut in Germany from July 7–9, 2023.

Festivals
 Miami (2015–2017), Miami Gardens (2018–2019); (2021–present)
 Bay Area: Mountain View (2017), Oakland (2018–19)
 Southern California: San Bernardino (2017, 2021), Los Angeles (2018–19), Inglewood (2023)
 Sydney, Australia (2019)
 Hong Kong: Kowloon (2019, cancelled)
 New York City (2019, 2021–2022)
 Bucharest, Romania (2022-present)
 Portimão, Portugal (2022–present)
 Toronto, Canada (2022)
 Thailand: Pattaya (2023–present)
 The Netherlands: Hilvarenbeek (2022); Rotterdam (2023)
 Germany: Munich (2023)

Notable events and incidents at festivals 
In 2017, Lil Uzi Vert stage-dived into the crowd from a two-story scaffolding at Rolling Loud Miami.

In 2017, at Rolling Loud in Mountain View, California, rapper Lil B was allegedly assaulted by rapper A Boogie wit da Hoodie and his crew. B's performance was cancelled, allegedly due to his equipment having been stolen by the assailants.

In 2018, at Rolling Loud in Miami, Meek Mill made his second live performance after being released from prison with a surprise set at the festival.

In 2018, Offset publicly apologized to Cardi B on Stage during her headlining set at Rolling Loud Los Angeles.

In 2018, Young Dolph flew out Duke University Baristas who were fired for playing his music and gifted them $20,000 on stage at Rolling Loud Miami.

In 2019, Lil Uzi Vert Announced His Highly Anticipated Second Studio Album Eternal Atake Was Finished On Stage At Rolling Loud Miami.

NPR described Rolling Loud as a "hotbed for arrests", and according to The New York Times, "Rolling Loud events have been connected to arrests and violence in the past." The 2019 edition of the Miami festival has been described as "plagued by chaos".

In 2019, at Rolling Loud in Los Angeles, a 23-year-old attendee named Kalvin Sanchez was assaulted and rushed to the hospital after suffering serious head injuries. He died four days later; his death was deemed a homicide.

In 2021, before entering the festival grounds of Rolling Loud New York, rapper Fetty Wap was arrested on federal drug charges at New York’s Citi Field for conspiracy to distribute hard drugs such as heroin, cocaine and fentanyl.

In 2022, rapper Travis Scott came out for Future’s headliner set at Rolling Loud Miami. In 2022, Travis Scott was sued for allegedly causing a stampede during his performance at Rolling Loud in Miami three years prior, in 2019. The lawsuit claimed that Scott was being negligent by encouraging the crowd to become more aggressive while people were "being injured, suffocating, losing consciousness, fighting and being trampled".

In July 2022, during the first day of Rolling Loud in Miami, multiple objects were thrown at rapper and singer Kid Cudi from the crowd during his set, including a water bottle thrown at his face. In response, Cudi gave the crowd an ultimatum to curtail its unruly behavior, but after another object was thrown at him, he cut off his performance and left the stage. (Shortly after Cudi's set ended, rapper Lil Durk began his set and brought out Kanye West to perform their single "Hot Shit". Ironically, West had previously left the festival lineup after being scheduled to perform, and had been replaced by Cudi.)

In 2022, Lil Tjay returned to the stage for Rolling Loud NY after being shot In June. The Rolling Loud appearance was the rapper's first gig since being shot seven times.

In 2022, Nicki Minaj became the first solo female rapper to headline Rolling Loud at Rolling Loud New York.

In 2023, Don Toliver brought out surprise guests Kali Uchis, James Blake, and Justin Bieber during his set at Rolling Loud California. This was Justin Bieber’s first performance since the cancellation of his Justice World Tour.

Other events
In 2020, virtual live performances called “Loud Streams” were streamed on Twitch. The first event was held on September 12–13, and the second on October 30–31. In 2021, archived performances from the Miami and Bay Area festivals from 2017 were streamed on the festival's official YouTube channel. Each festival is annually livestreamed. Usually simulcast on the YouTube and Twitch channels, however Revolt broadcast it in 2017, LiveXLive in 2018, and Be At TV in 2019. Rolling Loud presented a two night showcase at the Stubb's Bar-B-Q venue during South by Southwest in Austin, Texas in 2022.

Outside of festivals, Rolling Loud also promotes and sponsors several concert tours.

On December 9, 2022, Rolling Loud released its first single titled "Finger Food" featuring Rae Sremmurd and Duke Deuce.

Philanthropy 
In 2021, the Black Music Action Coalition and Rolling Loud partnered for Social Justice Initiatives. The collaboration highlighted activism and community through panel discussions and fundraising efforts throughout the three-days of Rolling Loud California.

In 2021, rapper Zoey Dollaz and Rolling Loud Co-Founder, Tariq Cherif, chartered several jets to Haiti to provide supplies to people in the wake of a massive earthquake.

In 2022, The Miami Jr. HEAT teamed up with Rolling Loud to host 50 local children from After-School All-Stars for a basketball clinic at the festival.

In 2023, Rolling Loud partnered with DGK to host a skateboard giveback on the grounds of SoFi Stadium. Rolling Loud Co-Founder, Tariq Cherif, Inglewood city officials, and professional skateboarder Don Cooley, gifted 40 students from Kelso Elementary with DGK skateboards and helmets.

References

External links
 Official website

Hip hop music festivals
Music festivals established in 2015
Music festivals in Miami